Ryan Palmer (born 1976) is an American golfer.

Ryan Palmer may also refer to:

Ryan Palmer (chess player) (born 1974), Jamaican chess player
Ryan Palmer (darts player) (born 1987), English darts player